Patrizia Manassero (born 1 October 1960) is an Italian politician who served as Senator from 2013 to 2018.

She was elected Mayor of Cuneo at the 2022 Italian local elections, the first woman in the city's history.

References

1960 births
21st-century Italian women politicians
Mayors of Cuneo
Democratic Party (Italy) politicians
Senators of Legislature XVII of Italy
Living people
Women members of the Senate of the Republic (Italy)